The Cartier Affair is a 1984 NBC TV movie that starred Knight Riders David Hasselhoff and Dynastys Joan Collins, which also featured Kojaks Telly Savalas.

Plot
Curt Taylor (David Hasselhoff) is released from California State Prison and to settle a debt he becomes a secretary for Cartier Rand (Joan Collins) as a form of amusing punishment, so that he can steal her jewels.  During the course of his employment for Cartier, He falls in love with her, which complicates his primary mission to steal from her, Cartier reciprocates his feelings and the two begin an affair.

Cast and crew

External links
 

1984 films
1984 television films
1984 comedy films
NBC network original films
American comedy television films
Films scored by Arthur B. Rubinstein
Films directed by Rod Holcomb
1980s English-language films
1980s American films